The fourth Orbán government (Hungarian: negyedik Orbán-kormány) was the Government of Hungary from 18 May 2018 to 24 May 2022, after the 2018 parliamentary elections, led by Viktor Orbán.

Policy

Social policy
On 2018 October, Orban's government issued a decree that came into force, removing gender studies from the list of master's programmes. The subject will be banned at Hungarian universities.

On 2020 19 May, Hungary outlaws changing birth gender on documents. The law, proposed by Fidesz party, passed by 133 votes to 57.

In November 2020, it was announced that Orban's government wanted to amended the definition of family in its constitution to allow an effective ban on adoption by same-sex couples and to mention in the constitution that the mother is a woman, the father a man. On 15 December 2020 The Hungarian parliament passes a law that effectively bans adoptions by same-sex couples. According to the measure, only married couples can adopt children while single people must obtain special approval to adopt from the family affairs minister, Lawmakers also amended the Hungarian constitution, with a new definition for family as the union of a father who is a man and a mother who is a woman. The Law passed by 134 votes to 45, with 5 abstentions.

On June 5, 2021, it was announced that Orban's government wanted a new law banning the 'promotion' of homosexuality and gender change to children under the age of 18 in schools, films or books. On 15 June The Hungarian parliament passed a new law that bans the 'promotion' of homosexuality and gender change to children in schools, films or books. Critics compared it to the 2013 Russian gay propaganda law. The Law passed by 157 votes to 1, with 41 abstentions. Fidesz–KDNP, Jobbik and Mi Hazánk voted for the law.

George Soros
On 16 May 2018, George Soros's Open Society Foundations announced it would move its office from Budapest to Berlin amid Hungarian government interference.

On 20 June 2018, the Hungarian Parliament passed a "Stop Soros law." Under it, anyone "facilitating illegal immigration" will face a year in jail.

On 3 December 2018, the Soros-linked Central European University announced it would cease operations in Hungary and relocate to Vienna, after the Hungarian government refused to sign an agreement allowing it to continue operations in Hungary.

China
In April 2021, it was announced that Orban's government wanted to build Chinese Fudan University campus with Chinese loans in Hungary. According to the plan the university campus would be built by a pre-approved (Chinese state construction firm), with workers, building materials and a €1.25 billion (HUF 450 billion) loan from China.

According to an opinion poll by think tank Republikon Institute, 66% of Hungarians oppose and 27% support the idea of the campus. Some 89 percent of opposition voters oppose the plan, as do 31 percent of the ruling Fidesz party's own supporters. The Opposition parties have called for a referendum. On 5 June 2020, an estimated 10,000 protested against building the university.

Party breakdown

Beginning of term
Party breakdown of cabinet ministers in the beginning of term:

End of term
Party breakdown of cabinet ministers in the end of term:

Members of the Cabinet

Composition
Government press officer Bertalan Havasi announced members of the cabinet on 27 April 2018.

Gen. Tibor Benkő, who has served as Chief of the General Staff of the Armed Forces of Hungary since 2010 was nominated to the position of Minister of Defence. After retiring, he took office as a civilian.

References

2018 establishments in Hungary
2022 disestablishments in Hungary
Cabinets established in 2018
Cabinets disestablished in 2022
Hungarian governments
Government